Rudolf Wampfler (born 5 October 1949) is a Swiss former footballer who played in the 1970s as midfielder. 

Born in Raron, near Sion, Wampfler played his youth football by local club FC Raron and advanced to their first team. He then moved on to play for FC Sion in 1970. 

Wampfler joined Basel's first team for their 1973–74 season under team manager Helmut Benthaus. After playing in four test games and one Swiss League Cup match, Wampfler played his domestic league debut for his new club in the away game on 18 August 1973 as Basel won 1–0 against Chênois. He scored his first goal for his club on 20 September in first round of the 1973–74 European Cup in the away game at the Kleinholz Stadion in Olten as Basel won 6–2 against Icelandic sports club Fram Reykjavík. In the next round during the for Basel legendary game against Belgien team Club Brugge, Wampfler scored twice as Basel won 6–4 (7–6 on aggregate). Wampfler scored his first domestic league goal for Basel on 11 November in the away game as the team won 3–2 against Servette.

In his one season with the club Wampfler played a total of forty-four games for Basel scoring a total of six goals. Eighteen of these games were in the Nationalliga A, five in the Swiss Cup and Swiss League Cup, five in the European Cup and fifteen were friendly games. He scored two goals in the domestic league, three in the European Cup and the other was scored during the test games.

After his season with Basel, Wampfler moved on to play one season for FC Fribourg, who at that time played on the Nationalliga B, second team of Swiss football. Then he moved on again to play for CS Chênois.

References

Sources
 Die ersten 125 Jahre. Publisher: Josef Zindel im Friedrich Reinhardt Verlag, Basel. 
 Verein "Basler Fussballarchiv" Homepage

1949 births
Living people
FC Basel players
FC Sion players
FC Fribourg players
CS Chênois players
Swiss men's footballers
Association football midfielders
Sportspeople from Valais